Whitebridge or White's Bridge may refer to:

Places
 White's Bridge, an historic bridge crossing the Flat River in Michigan
 Whitebridge, New South Wales, a suburb of the city of Lake Macquarie
 Whitebridge, Scotland, a small village in the Highlands of Scotland, near Loch Ness

Art, entertainment, and media
 Whitebridge (Wheel of Time), a fictional town in the nation of Andor, in Robert Jordan's The Wheel of Time series

See also
 Black Bridge (disambiguation)
 Negroponte (disambiguation)
 White Bridge (disambiguation)